Chionodes regens is a moth in the family Gelechiidae. It is found in North America, where it has been recorded from Colorado, Nebraska, South Dakota, Wyoming and Arizona.

References

Chionodes
Moths described in 1999
Moths of North America